The South African Women's Masters is a golf tournament in South Africa.

First played in 1996 it is the second oldest professional women's golf tournament in South Africa, after the South African Women's Open founded in 1988. The inaugural event was won by South Africa's Sally Little, a two-time LPGA major winner.

The tournament was included on the Ladies European Tour in 2001 and played at Gary Player Country Club in Sun City.
It is sanctioned by the WPGA and supported by Women's Golf South Africa (the governing body for amateur golf), and is played as part of the Sunshine Ladies Tour.

Winners

See also
 South African Women's Open

References

External links

List of winners

Former Ladies European Tour events
Sunshine Ladies Tour events
Golf tournaments in South Africa
Recurring sporting events established in 1996